Divya Gokulnath is an Indian entrepreneur and educator who is the co-founder and director of Byju's, an educational technology company founded in 2012 in Bangalore, India.

Early life and education
Divya was born in Bengaluru. Her father is a nephrologist with Apollo Hospitals and her mother was a programming executive with the broadcasting company Doordarshan. She is an only child of her parents. As a child, her father taught her science.

Divya completed her schooling at Frank Anthony Public School and pursued a Bachelor of Technology in Biotechnology from RV College of Engineering in Bengaluru. After her graduation in 2007, she met Byju Raveendran, who was teaching her GRE exam prep course. Byju encouraged her to become a teacher due to her questions during breaks between the classes.

Her career as a teacher began in 2008 at age 21. In 2020, she told Fortune India, "It was an auditorium style class with 100 students. They were just a couple of years younger than me so to look mature I wore a saree to the class." During her teaching career, she taught mathematics, English, and logical reasoning.

Career

In 2011, Divya co-founded the online education platform Byju's with her husband. At first, the company offered in-person education to support school education, and in 2015, launched an online app with video lessons. Divya has appeared in videos as a teacher. During the COVID-19 lockdown in India, Divya managed user experience, content, and brand marketing. She led BYJU's free access to its educational content so students could continue learning from home during the pandemic. Byju's reportedly added 13.5 million users in March and April 2020, for a total of 50 million, and reached 70 million students by September 2020, and 4.5 million subscribers.

According to Forbes, as of 2020, Divya, her husband  Byju Raveendran and his  brother Riju Raveendran, have a combined net worth of $3.05 billion.

Divya also writes online, including about the future of education, parenting, and women's participation in STEM fields and has been an advocate for mitigating gender pay gap in India. She has also spoken with Mint Startup Diaries about challenges for women entrepreneurs, and co-written an opinion article with Byju Raveendran in Vogue India about educational technology in India.

In March 2022, Gokulnath was appointed as the Federation of Indian Chambers of Commerce & Industry's EdTech Taskforce Chair.

Honours and awards

Personal life
Divya is married to  Byju Raveendran. As of April 2020, Divya lived with eleven other family members, including their young son and then their second child was born near the beginning of 2021. Before the COVID-19 pandemic, she worked long days at the office, but during the lockdown, began working from home. In 2021, she told The Indian Express her typical day includes "juggling son's online classes, meetings, recording video lessons and spending time with newborn."

References

External links 

Living people
Indian company founders
Indian billionaires
Businesspeople from Kerala
21st-century Indian businesswomen
21st-century Indian businesspeople
Businesspeople from Bangalore
Businesspeople in education
1987 births
Byju's